Madaline Lee (October 28, 1902 – January 10, 1974) was a mid 20th century American actress, best known for her role as secretary Genevieve Blue on the Amos 'n' Andy radio program, and for her peripheral involvement in a blacklisting scandal in the 1940s.

Madaline Basford was born on October 28, 1902 in Texas.

She died at The Ravenswood and was buried in Forest Lawn Memorial Park.

References

External links 
Madaline Lee's profile at Old Time Radio

1902 births
1974 deaths
Actresses from Texas
American radio actresses
Burials at Forest Lawn Memorial Park (Hollywood Hills)
20th-century American actresses